Kaneez Surka is a South African improv artist, actress, comedian and a YouTuber of an Indian descent, who works mainly in India. She started her career with the show The Week That Wasn't. She has performed on various stand up platforms. She was a judge on the first two seasons of the Amazon Prime Video stand-up comedy reality show Comicstaan. She also hosts an online comedy game show, The General Fun Game Show on YouTube.

Personal life
Kaneez Surka was born and raised in the Mthatha, South Africa. She studied in DSG, Graham School and attended Rhodes University, where she obtained a Bachelor of Arts in law and psychology.

Ethnically a Gujarati, Kaneez Surka was born into a Muslim family originally from Kapadvanj.

Career
Surka was part of the Mumbai improv scene since 2009. Her initial work in Mumbai was with Divya Palat's Imps troupe. Surka was co-director of a Mumbai-based story-telling club "Tall Tales" in 2013.

She achieved mainstream popularity on the satirical news show The Week That Wasn't on CNN-News18 (formerly CNN-IBN). She also worked with Weirdass Comedy, a Vir Das venture and then began collaborating with and making appearances in several All India Bakchod videos including roles such as Clitika from 'A woman's besties', 'Honest wedding', 'Honest Bars' and the Instagram character from 'If Apps were people'. She was also a judge for shows such as Comicstaan and 'Improv All Stars' for Amazon Prime and Queens of Comedy for TLC. Surka is part of an improv group called "The Improvisers" along with Abish Mathew, Kanan Gill, and Kenny Sebastian,  and has an Improv special titled 'Something From Nothing' on Amazon Prime Video. She also teaches the art of improv comedy, proving her comedic skills by being a judge in Amazon Prime's stand-up comedy reality show Comicstaan.

Filmography

Web

References

External links
 

Year of birth missing (living people)
Living people
People from Mthatha
South African women comedians
South African stand-up comedians
South African YouTubers
South African film actresses
South African television actresses
South African people of Gujarati descent
South African people of Indian descent
South African Muslims
Actresses of Indian descent
South African emigrants to India
South African expatriate actresses in India
Actresses in Hindi cinema
Actresses in Hindi television
Rhodes University alumni
Women humorists
21st-century South African actresses